, also credited as , is a Japanese voice actress.

Voice roles

Anime

Television 
 Mahoraba: Heartful Days (2005), Archer Girl A (ep 6), Micchan, Mummy girl (ep 20), Risona Aizawa (Friend C), Yo-chan

Original video animations 
 Wet Summer Days (2003), Sayaka Shirakawa (eps 1, 4), Sayo Minase (ep 2)
 Triangle Heart: Sweet Songs Forever (2003), Akira Jōshima (waitress at Midori-ya; eps 1, 3–4)

Drama CD 
 Love Doll: Lovely Idol, Hina Hōjō
 Suigetsu: Yume Shizuku, Yuki Kotonomiya

References

External links 
 Official website (Japanese)
 

Japanese voice actresses
Living people
Year of birth missing (living people)